Dame Sarah Jane Frances Goad, DCVO (née Lambert; born 1940) is a British public official.

Goad was born in 1940; her parents were Uvedale Lambert and his wife Melanie. She worked for the publishers Faber and Faber from 1959 until 1970, when she became a partner in Lambert Farmers (she had been a director of Tilburstow Farms Co. for seven years prior to this). She continued as a partner until 1994.

In the meantime, Goad became increasingly involved in public life; she was made a magistrate for Surrey in 1974, and was Deputy Chair of the bench's Family Panel from 1992 to 1997. She sat on a range of other local organisations and chaired Southwark Cathedral Council from 2000 to 2008.

In 1997, Goad became Lord Lieutenant of Surrey and in 2012 was appointed a Dame Commander of the Royal Victorian Order for her service in that office; she retired three years later.

References 

Living people
1940 births
Lord-Lieutenants of Surrey
Dames Commander of the Royal Victorian Order